Koordersiochloa is a widespread genus of plants in the grass family, native to Africa, tropical Asia, and various islands in the Indian Ocean.

 Species
 Koordersiochloa longiarista (A.Rich.) Veldkamp - central + southern Africa (from Nigeria to KwaZulu-Natal), Réunion, Java, Philippines, Lesser Sunda Islands
 Koordersiochloa sanjappae (Kabeer & V.J.Nair) Veldkamp - State of Tamil Nadu in southern India

References

Pooideae
Poaceae genera
Taxa named by Elmer Drew Merrill